Phil Cummings is a South Australian children's fiction author. Born in Port Broughton, his first book, "Goodness Gracious", was published in 1989. Since then he has published over 60 children's books.

Two of Cummings' works have been turned into theatrical productions. Windmill Performing Arts produced a production of "Boom Bah!" in 2008, and John Schumann composed a musical version of "Danny Allen was here" for the 2012 Festival of Music.

Awards
 Carclew Fellowship, 1998.
 Children's Book Council of Australia Notable Book for Breakaway, 2002.
 Adelaide Festival of Arts Awards for Children's Literature, shortlisted, for "Danny Allen was here", 2008.
 CBCA 2016 Honour Picture Book of the Year  for “Ride, Ricardo, Ride!”
 CBCA 2018 Shortlisted Book of the Year : Early Childhood for "Boy"
 "Boy" was also the winner of the 2017 Children's Peace Literature Award.

Partial bibliography
 Cummings, Phil; Smith, Craig (illustrator). (1989). "Goodness Gracious!" Ashton Scholastic Books Australia. 
 Cummings, Phil. (1997). "Angel". Random House Australia. 
 Cummings, Phil. (2000). "Breakaway". Random House Australia. 
 Cummings, Phil. (2002). "Tearaway". Random House Australia. 
 Cummings, Phil. (2007). "Danny Allen Was Here". Pan Macmillan. 
 Cummings, Phil. (2008). "Take it Easy, Danny Allen". Pan Macmillan. 
 Cummings, Phil; Rycroft, Nina (illustrator). (2008). "Boom Bah!" Working Title Press.

References

External links
 

Australian children's writers
Living people
Date of birth missing (living people)
Year of birth missing (living people)